Perumugham or Pullikkadavu is a small village near Feroke in Kozhikode District, Kerala, India.

Administration
Perumugham and Pullikkadavu are part of Feroke Municipality in Kozhikode District.

Transportation
Perumugham is connected to Feroke and Ramanattukara by road.

Villages and suburbs
 Karaliparamb
 Olippilpara
 Kallikkoodam

Landmarks
 Thulissery Shri Ayyappa Temple, Kallikkoodam
 Malakkav Bhagavathi Temple
 Malayil Mahakali Temple
 Ennakkad Juma Masjidh
 TP Muhammed Kutty vayanashala

Festivals
Malayil Mahakali Temple, Pullikkadavu conducts an annual festival which attracts many devotees from nearby villages.

References

Villages in Kozhikode district
Kozhikode south